Septet: The Story of Hong Kong is a 2020 Hong Kong anthology historical drama film directed by Sammo Hung, Ann Hui, Patrick Tam, Yuen Woo-ping, Ringo Lam, Johnnie To and Tsui Hark, seven filmmakers of the Hong Kong New Wave. It is divided into seven stories, each corresponding to a decade in Hong Kong's history, told from the view of ordinary people. It was originally intended for there to be a segment about the 1970s directed by John Woo, but he withdrew for health reasons and the segment was never produced.

The film features an ensemble cast that includes Timmy Hung, Francis Ng, Sire Ma, Jennifer Yu, Ian Gouw, Yuen Wah, Ashley Lin, Simon Yam, Mimi Kung, Cheung Tat-ming, Emotion Cheung, Ng Wing-sze, Tony Wu, Eric Tsui, Royce Lam, Chung King-fai, Lam Suet and Lawrence Lau. Production began in early January 2014 and concluded in August 2014.

The film was screened at the Busan International Film Festival in October 2020, and includes the posthumous work of Ringo Lam, who died in 2018. The film was originally set to be released in 2021 but was delayed due to the COVID-19 pandemic. It was then released in Hong Kong on 28 July 2022 and China on 29 July 2022. The film received mostly positive reviews.

Cast and crew

References

External links 

Films directed by Johnnie To
Anthology films
Hong Kong historical drama films
Films directed by Yuen Woo-ping
Films directed by Ann Hui
Films directed by Tsui Hark
Films directed by Ringo Lam
Milkyway Image films
2020 drama films